Carviçais is a parish of the municipality of Torre de Moncorvo in the district of Bragança (Portugal). The population in 2011 was 757, in an area of 63.00 km². The parish is composed of 7 villages: Carviçais, Macieirinha, Martim Tirado, Quinta da Estrada, Quinta das Pereiras, Quinta das Peladinhas and Quinta da Nogueirinha.

History and landmarks
Parish Church (Igreja Matriz) of Carviçais
Capela do Santo Cristo de Carviçais
Capela de St.ª Bárbara
Capela do Divino Espírito Santo
Capela de S. Pedro
Cruzeiro de Carviçais
Carviçais Old Rail Station

Transport

As the narrow gauge Sabor line (Linha do Sabor) ceased to run in 1988, the closest railway station is now Pocinho in the Douro Valley (Linha do Douro) with trains to Tua, Peso da Régua, Livração, Marco de Canaveses, Penafiel, Paredes, Ermesinde (connections to Braga, Guimarães, Viana do Castelo, Rio Tinto and Porto).

References

External links 
 Fórum Carviçais
 Genealogias de Carviçais
 Académico de Carviçais
 Carviçais Tur

Freguesias of Torre de Moncorvo